Bhagya Chakra (Wheel of Fate) is a 1935 Indian Bengali-language film directed by Nitin Bose. The film was remade in Hindi in the same year, titled Dhoop Chhaon.

Cast
 Biswanath Bhadhuri as Shamlal
 Haricharan Bandyopadhyay as Hiralal
 K.C.Dey as Surdas
 Nivanani Debi as Paanchir Ma
 Amar Mullick as Theatre Manager
 Keshto Das as Assistant Manager
 Pahari Sanyal as Dipak
 Durgadas Bannerjee as Mr.Ray
 Umasashi as Mira
 Debabala as Mira's mother
 Indu Mukherjee as Detective
 Shyam Law as Detective
 Pramathesh Barua as guest at party
 Vikram Nahar as guest#2
 Nagendrabala as Nurse
 Sailen Pal as 'Stage'- Dipak
 Ahi Sanyal as bad singer

References

External links
 

Bengali-language Indian films
1935 films
Films directed by Nitin Bose
1935 drama films
Bengali films remade in other languages
1930s Bengali-language films
Indian drama films
Indian black-and-white films